Nessa O’Mahony is an Irish poet and a freelance teacher and writer.

Life and work

Born in Dublin, she was educated in St Louis High School, Rathmines before going on to University College Dublin to study English. She was a recipient of the Mary Colum Award for being the highest placed female student in English Literature for the BA in 1984. O'Mahony worked as a journalist in RTÉ Aertel and Lafferty Publications, before switching to public relations with roles in the Irish Insurance Federation and Arts Council (Ireland), where she was Head of Public Affairs (1999-2002).

She began writing poetry in 1994.  She published her first collection of poems, Bar Talk, in 1999, and was a regular presenter on the radio show Writers Inc. Anna Livia FM from 1997 to 1999. She returned to full-time education in 2002, completing a Masters in Creative Writing at the University of East Anglia (2003) and a PhD in Creative and Critical Writing at the University of Wales Bangor in 2006.

Since then she has won awards for her poetry, worked as assistant Editor of UK literary journal Orbis, tutors for the Open Education department at  Dublin City University and teaches workshops on poetry and writing through a number of venues including the Open University.

Her works have been translated into several languages and published across the world. She lives in Rathfarnham.

Awards and bursaries
 1996 Joint winner of the Kerry International Summer School Poetry Competition
 1997 National Women's Poetry Competition 
 shortlisted Patrick Kavanagh Prize 
 shortlisted Hennessy Literature Awards
 2004, 2011 and 2018 Awarded an Arts Council of Ireland literature bursary
 2005 Simba Gill Fellowship 
 2007 Artists’ bursary from South Dublin County Council
 Artist in residence at the John Hume Institute for Global Irish Studies at University College Dublin

Criticism
Novelist Joseph O'Connor (In Sight of Home) :‘a moving, powerful and richly pleasurable read, audaciously imagined and achieved’ 

Poet Tess Gallagher (Her Father’s Daughter) :‘words are her witching sticks and she employs them with beautiful, engaging intent, the better to make present what has preceded and what approaches.’

Bibliography
 Bar Talk (Italics Press, 1999)
 Trapping a Ghost (Bluechrome, 2005)
 In Sight of Home(Salmon, 2009)
 Her Father's Daughter (Salmon, 2014)
 The Branchman (Arlen House, 2018)
 The Hollow Woman on the Island (Salmon, 2019)

Co-editions

 Eavan Boland. Inside History (with Dr. Siobhán Campbell) (Arlen House 2016)
 Metamorphic. 21st century poets respond to Ovid (with Paul Munden) (Recent Work Press 2017)

References

External links
 Official website biography

Living people
Alumni of the University of East Anglia
Irish women poets
20th-century Irish poets
20th-century Irish women writers
21st-century Irish poets
21st-century Irish women writers
Writers from Dublin (city)
Year of birth missing (living people)